Ultramarine Magmell is a Chinese manhua series written and illustrated by Dainenbyo (Chinese: 第年秒/Dìniánmiǎo).  A Japanese anime television series adaptation by Studio Signpost (formerly known as Pierrot+) aired from April 7 to June 30, 2019.

Characters

Media

Manhua
Dainenbyo launched the manhua on Fanfan Dongman's Fan Manhua website. Later the series was licensed and translated in Japan on Shueisha's shōnen manga app Shōnen Jump+ in June 2015 under the name Gunjō no Magmell.  Eight volumes have been published to date.

Anime
An anime television series adaptation was announced on April 29, 2018.  The series is directed by Hayato Date and written by Chūji Mikasano, with animation by Pierrot+. The series' music is composed by Yasuharu Takanashi. It aired from April 7 to June 30, 2019 on Tokyo MX and BS Fuji. Fudanjuku is performing the series' opening theme song "Dash&Daaash!!", while a flood of circle is performing the series' ending theme song "The Key". Netflix streamed the series on October 10, 2019.

Footnotes

References

External links
  
 

2019 anime television series debuts
Adventure anime and manga
Fantasy anime and manga
Netflix original anime
Shōnen manga
Shueisha franchises
Shueisha manga
Studio Signpost
Tokyo MX original programming